Alexey Ivanov (born 18 April 1979, sometimes transliterated as Alexei or Aleksei/y) is a paralympic athlete from Russia competing mainly in category F56  events.

Alexey has competed at four Paralympics in 1996, 2000, 2004 and 2008.  He has competed in various events from 100m up to marathon, pentathlon and shot.  He only ever won one medal, a silver medal in the 5000m in 2000.

References

External links
 

Paralympic athletes of Russia
Athletes (track and field) at the 1996 Summer Paralympics
Athletes (track and field) at the 2000 Summer Paralympics
Athletes (track and field) at the 2004 Summer Paralympics
Athletes (track and field) at the 2008 Summer Paralympics
Paralympic silver medalists for Russia
Medalists at the 2000 Summer Paralympics
Paralympic medalists in athletics (track and field)
Living people
1979 births
Russian wheelchair racers
21st-century Russian people